Irbis ( 650 or 652) was according to a number of Russian sources the founder of the Khazar Khaganate. The Khazars traced their origin to the Turkic Ashina clan who also founded the Onok Khaganate and Turkic Khaganate in Central Asia.

Peter Golden notes that Chinese and Arabic reports are almost identical, making the connection a strong one, and conjectures that Khazar leader may have been Irbis Seguy, who lost power or was killed around 651.

References 

7th-century Turkic people
Khazar rulers
7th-century rulers in Asia